The most important event of the 2003/04 Ystalyfera RFC season was the creation of Regional Rugby in 2003, which resulted in a major restructuring of the National League. For Ystalyfera this meant re-classification into Division Three South West.

Adding to the excitement was the first meeting in the league against near neighbours Ystradgynlais RFC since 1980-81 – they were in ‘free-fall’ from their glorious ‘Professional’ era when their only saviour would prove to be their youth squad structure.

Opponents by design were now not too far away in comparison to previous years, Ystalyfera would campaign a relegation battle with Skewen, Seven Sisters, Ystradgynlais and Trebanos, the latter two losing out finishing below the ‘Fera at the end of the season.

Cup exits were again early except for the Welsh Cup. A 1st Round bye was followed by a 2nd Round victory over Taibach 30-19. The 3rd round was a big exit from the event 0-55 away at Bridgend Athletic.

At the time of the first encounter with Ystrad’ on 27 December, the league position was three wins and eight defeats. A 12-3 win with tries from Ashley Carter and Graham Jones, a conversion by Gareth James and sin bins for Neil Lynch and Arwel Williams, stood as the only victory until the next encounter between the sides, when ‘Fera won on 6 March 2004 23-5 at Ynysydarren. Scorers in this second encounter were Ashley Carter one try, Dai Thomas a try, Damian James two conversions and three penalties.
Now becoming a regular habit wins in the last two games ensured safety for another season.

Top scorer was Damian James with a personal record of 220 points, he also scored 13 tries, one more than Ashley Carter. Captain this season was Martyn Stoneman. Players Player was Mark Rewston and Supporters Player hooker Tristian Davies.

National League Division 3 South West

Ystalyfera 2003/04 Season Results

Ystalyfera 2003/04 Season Player Stats

References

Sport in Neath Port Talbot